Isiala-Ngwa South is a Local Government Area of Abia State, Nigeria. Its headquarters are in the town of Omoba.

Omoba is a railway town 22 kilometres away from Aba city centre. After coal was discovered at Udi, the Eastern Railway with station in the town was built to Port Harcourt between 1913 and 1916. This railway was extended to Kaduna via Kafanchan in 1927, connecting the Eastern Railway to the Lagos–Kano Railway. The Eastern Railway was extended to its northeastern terminus of Maiduguri between 1958 and 1964.

The National Integrated Power Project [NIPP] saw the building of a sub-power station at the heart of Omoba which has improved power supply within the town in recent times.

The Clifford University Owerrinta, one of the 144 tertiary institutions owned and operated by the Seventh-day Adventist Church and the Eastern Polytechnic, Umuoko are among the tertiary education institutions in the local government.

According to the Audited Financial Statements Report for the year ended December 31, 2020, the total accrued revenue for the year amounted to ₦1,909,470,171.11. Over 63.70% of this amount, that is, ₦1,216,755,647.97 was realized as statutory revenue from Federal Accounts Allocation Committee (FAAC). A sum of ₦471,564,524.20 was internally generated. This amount constituted about 24.70% of the total accrued revenue. A sum of N10,206,459.83 represents Value Added Tax. This amount constituted about 0.54% of the total accrued revenue and other capital receipts of N200,235,294.12 representing 10.50%. The remaining 0.56% was Transfer from Consolidated Revenue Fund, which amounted to ₦10,708,244.99.

Total expenditure incurred during the year amounted to ₦2,038,246,642.26.This comprises ₦738,441,232.13 for Salary and; ₦42,982,267.66 for Over Head; and N1,256,823,142.47 being Transfer Payments to Govt. Establishments. 
 
It has an area of 258 km and a population of 134,762 at the 2006 census. The first executive chairman is Chief Damian Ozurumba.

List of Towns and Villages

Ovu-Ngwu

Agbaragwu
Amaede
Eke-na-Ekpu
Iheneriala
Ngwama
Okpungwu
Umuaja
Umuakpor
Umuapu I
Umuapu II
Umuejije
Umuihi
Umuotiri
Umuukuru

Osokwa – Nvosi

Umuetegha
Iheoji
Ikem
Mgbogbo-Ndiolumbe
Nkpuruta-Ndiolumbe
Ntigha
Ogele-Ukwu
Umuabali
Umuada

Isiala Nvosi

Amaku
Kputuke
Eziama
Mgbokonta
Obuba
Ohuhu Ekwuru
Umuawuru
Umuofa
Umuejea
Umunevo
Umunko
Umunkpeyi
Umunwanbi
Umuobefu
Umuogele
Umuokiri
Umuomacha
Umuezu

Ehi-Na-Uguru Nvosi

Amaiyi
Ebeyi
Umuehim
Umuguru
Umuokpogho

Ovu-Okwu

Amauha
Obikwesu
Okpuala
Ovorji
Umiri
Umuakwa
Umuegoro
Umueleghele
Umuene
Umuowa
Umurasi

Omoba

Umugba
Umuagu
Umuamosi
Umuzoechi
Umuikea
Umuire
Umuokoroukwu
Umuoleihe
Umuokegwu

Okporo Ahaba

Amuke
Mba
Mbutu Umuoke
Okpuhie
Umuajuju
Umuakuma
Umuenere
Umuhie
Umuoko

Mbutu

Amankwo
Egbelu-Mbutu/Umuokere
Obekwesu
Okungwu
Owerrinta
Uhum
Umogwu
Umuduru
Umuekwe
Umueleke
Umuezeocha
Umuichi
Umuocheala-Umuokorie
Umuojima Efene
Umuojima-Ukwu
Umuokwu Umuagu
Umuosisi
Umuosoala
Waterside

Amaise-Ahaba

Mabedeala
Nkpuka
Umuacha
Umuikaa
Umuvo

Ngwa

Amaudara
Umuala
Umuebi
Umuezeoji
Umundogu
Umunta

Amaise

Aga
Amaokpu
Nnoyi
Umuekene
Umunwarida

See also 
List of villages in Abia State

Note 

The postal code of the area is 451.

References

Local Government Areas in Abia State